Phipps is an unincorporated community located in the town of Lenroot, Sawyer County, Wisconsin, United States.

History
A post office called Phipps was in operation between 1883 and 1907. The community was named for W. H. Phipps, a railroad official.

Notes

Unincorporated communities in Sawyer County, Wisconsin
Unincorporated communities in Wisconsin